Nalband may refer to:

Nalband, Armenia
Nalband, Iran (disambiguation)
Nalbant, Romania
Nalband (tribe), Muslim community